Guy Hadida (born 23 July 1995) is an Israeli professional footballer who plays for Ukrainian Premier League side Chornomorets Odesa.

References

External links
 

1995 births
Living people
Israeli footballers
Footballers from Hod HaSharon
Hapoel Tel Aviv F.C. players
Maccabi Yavne F.C. players
Hapoel Kfar Saba F.C. players
Beitar Tel Aviv Bat Yam F.C. players
Hapoel Haifa F.C. players
Maccabi Petah Tikva F.C. players
Hapoel Jerusalem F.C. players
Maccabi Bnei Reineh F.C. players
Sakaryaspor footballers
FC Chornomorets Odesa players
Israeli Premier League players
Liga Leumit players
Israeli expatriate footballers
Expatriate footballers in Turkey
Israeli expatriate sportspeople in Turkey
Expatriate footballers in Ukraine
Israeli expatriate sportspeople in Ukraine
Association football midfielders